Christiaan Hendrik Persoon (1 February 1761 – 16 November 1836) was a German mycologist who made additions to Linnaeus' mushroom taxonomy.

Early life

Persoon was born in South Africa at the Cape of Good Hope, the third child of an immigrant Pomeranian father and Dutch mother. His mother died soon after he was born; at the age of thirteen his father (who died a year later) sent him to Europe for his education.

Education

Initially studying theology at Halle, at age 22 (in 1784) Persoon switched to medicine at Leiden and Göttingen. He received a doctorate from the "Kaiserlich-Leopoldinisch-Carolinische Deutsche Akademie der Naturforscher" in 1799.

Later years

He moved to Paris in 1802, where he spent the rest of his life, renting an upper floor of a house in a poor part of town. He was apparently unemployed, unmarried, poverty-stricken and a recluse, although he corresponded with botanists throughout Europe. Because of his financial difficulties, Persoon agreed to donate his herbarium to the House of Orange, in return for an adequate pension for life.

Academic career

The origin of Persoon's botanical interest is unknown. The earliest of his works was Abbildungen der Schwämme (Illustrations of the fungi), published in three parts, in 1790, 1791, and 1793. In 1794, Persoon introduced the term  for the furrowed ascomata of the lichen genus Graphis. Between 1805 and 1807, he published two volumes of his Synopsis plantarum, a popular work describing 20,000 species of all types of plants. But his pioneering work was in the fungi, for which he published several works, beginning with the Synopsis methodica fungorum (1801); it is the starting point for nomenclature of the Uredinales, Ustilaginales, and the Gasteromycetes. Persoon described many polypore species; most were from his own collections in central Europe, while several other tropical species were sent to him from collections made by French botanist Charles Gaudichaud-Beaupré during his circumglobal expedition. These latter fungi are among the first tropical polypores ever described. In 1815, Persoon was elected a corresponding member of the Royal Swedish Academy of Sciences.

The genus Persoonia, a variety of small Australian trees and shrubs, was named after him. The title Persoonia is also given to a biannual scientific journal of molecular phylogeny and evolution of fungi, published jointly by the National Herbarium of the Netherlands and the CBS Fungal Biodiversity Centre.

See also
 :Category:Taxa named by Christiaan Hendrik Persoon

References 
 Duane Isely, One hundred and one botanists (Iowa State University Press, 1994), pp. 124–126.

External links

 Christian Hendrik Persoon
 Persoonia
 Hunt Institute-botanical archives

German taxonomists
1761 births
1836 deaths
Mycologists
Members of the Royal Swedish Academy of Sciences
Burials at Père Lachaise Cemetery
South African botanists
18th-century German botanists
19th-century German botanists
18th-century German writers
18th-century German male writers
19th-century German writers
19th-century German male writers
Members of the Bavarian Academy of Sciences
South African people of Dutch descent
South African people of German descent